The 2010 World Tour was a concert tour by rock band ZZ Top, which began in April 2010 and ended in December 2010. Like recent previous tours, it was a short outing, though for the first time in the band's career, they performed in South America, including three shows in Brazil. The band played many of their classic 1970s and 1980s hits. Critical reaction to the tour's shows was generally positive, although the absence of new material was noted. A great number of tickets were sold within a month of the tour's announcement, which prompted more dates to be added.

Itinerary 
On December 11, 2009, it was confirmed that ZZ Top would be headlining the High Voltage Festival in July 2010. The band announced five dates in South America, including three shows in Brazil; a video message by Billy Gibbons (speaking in Spanish) was posted on the band's official website for fans in Chile. Pre-sales began a month later and, according to ZZ Top's official Twitter, tickets for the May 20th show in São Paulo were sold-out. By the time the first North American leg was underway, more US concerts were announced, including festivals like Summerfest, Rocklahoma, and the Crossroads Guitar Festival. Subsequent dates with Tom Petty and the Heartbreakers in the fall were announced as well. This forced the band to cancel many previously booked engagements, several of them being with the Mick Fleetwood Blues Band; shows at the Telluride Blues & Brews Festival in Colorado, Kansas State Fair, and Meadowbrook U.S. Cellular Pavilion in New Hampshire were canceled. After touring Europe in the summer, the band returned to North America, where they toured with Tom Petty and the Heartbreakers. In October 2010, they made a brief stop in Europe, where the Doobie Brothers opened shows in Belgium, the Netherlands, and Norway.

Development 
Donny Stuart was the production manager and has been with ZZ Top for the last four decades. In 1999, ZZ Top hired Toby Francis as front of house engineer, who had previously worked with Jane's Addiction and Guns N' Roses. Francis left in late 2010 to work with The Smashing Pumpkins and the band hired Jamie Rephann as a replacement. Jake Mann, from Clair Brothers, was the monitor engineer and has worked with the band for four years. Chris Stuba was the lighting designer, working with lighting technician Bobby Dominguez and assistant lighting technician Jeff Archibeque.

The sound was provided by Clair, consisting of Martin Audio products including WSX subwoofers and W8C loudspeakers, which were powered by Martin MA 2.8 and 4.2 power amplifiers. Billy Gibbons and Dusty Hill did not use stage monitors or in-ear monitors; instead they relied on custom-made speaker cabinets to monitor themselves, a ritual that both Gibbons and Hill have used for years. Bandit Lites provided the lighting package, including mostly Vari-Lite fixtures, with VL3000 and VL2500 spotlights, as well as VL3500 floodlights. Martin Light MAC2000 floodlights, Atomic 3000 strobe lights and Color Kinetics ColorBlast 12 LED fixtures completed the lighting package. The lighting was controlled by a grandMA lighting control console. In 2005, the band had custom microphone stands made by John A. Douglas, who designed one of several skull-themed drum kits for Frank Beard used on the tour. The stands were made from truck exhaust pipes and had color-changing LED tubes built inside. Microphones were Telefunken M80s that were chrome plated.

Before beginning rehearsals for the tour, ZZ Top held a poll on their official website, asking fans to vote for their top three favorite songs. The results revealed that four songs were actually added to the band's set list: "Beer Drinkers and Hell Raisers", "Viva Las Vegas", "Francine", and "Thunderbird." The main set would include five songs from Eliminator (1983), three songs from Tres Hombres (1973), and two songs from Rio Grande Mud (1972); highlights in the show were a medley of "La Grange", "Sloppy Drunk Blues", and "Bar-B-Q." Billy Gibbons and Dusty Hill wore custom-made jackets designed by Jaime Castaneda, who has worked for Nudie Cohn and Manuel Cuevas; their jackets usually consisted of rhinestones.

Concert synopsis 
With the house lights down, the show began with a house music introduction. After about 50–60 seconds, the microphone stands would be lit, usually in a red color, and the band members would walk on stage. They started with a performance of "Got Me Under Pressure." The next song was "Waitin' for the Bus", which segued into "Jesus Just Left Chicago." After a performance of "Pincushion", they would play "I'm Bad, I'm Nationwide." The show continued with a 'blues hat' skit, in which Gibbons would ask for 'technicians' (one of them being Gibbons' wife) to hand him his fedora. This led into covers of "Future Blues" by Willie Brown and "Rock Me Baby" by B.B. King, followed by "Cheap Sunglasses." A snippet of "My Head's In Mississippi" was included before leading into a brief guitar solo by Gibbons and performing "I Need You Tonight." After playing a cover of Jimi Hendrix's "Hey Joe", the band performed "Brown Sugar" from their 1971 debut album, along with "Party on the Patio" from El Loco (1981) and "Just Got Paid" from Rio Grande Mud. The main set ended with "Gimme All Your Lovin'", "Sharp Dressed Man", and "Legs." After a brief break, the band returned to the stage. The encore began with the "La Grange" medley, which included a cover of "Sloppy Drunk Blues" and "Bar-B-Q" from Rio Grande Mud. "Tush" always closed the show. "Viva Las Vegas" was sometimes preceded "La Grange." In addition, "Beer Drinkers and Hell Raisers", "Viva Las Vegas", "Francine", and "Thunderbird" were variously performed only during the first North American leg.

Tour dates

Citations

References 

 
 
 
 
 
 
 
 
 
 
 
 
 
 
 
 
 
 
 
 
 
 

ZZ Top concert tours
2010 concert tours